Söderby is a village (smaller locality) situated in Ekerö Municipality, Stockholm County, southeastern Sweden with 250 inhabitants in 2010.

References 

Populated places in Ekerö Municipality
Uppland